In corporate governance, codetermination (also "copartnership" or "worker participation") is a practice where workers of an enterprise have the right to vote for representatives on the board of directors in a company. It also refers to staff having binding rights in work councils on issues in their workplace. The first laws requiring worker voting rights include the Oxford University Act 1854 and the Port of London Act 1908 in the United Kingdom, the Act on Manufacturing Companies of 1919 in Massachusetts in the United States (although the act's provisions were completely voluntary), and the Supervisory Board Act 1922 (Aufsichtsratgesetz 1922) in Germany, which codified collective agreement from 1918.

Most countries with codetermination laws have single-tier board of directors in their corporate law (such as Sweden, France or the Netherlands), while a number in central Europe (particularly Germany and Austria) have dual boards.

The threshold of a company's size where co-determination must apply varies between countries: in Denmark it is set at 20 employees, in Germany over 500 (for 1/3 representation) and 2000 (for just under a half), and in France for over 5000 employees. Sweden has had a law of codetermination since 1980.

Overview
In economies with codetermination, workers in large companies may form special bodies known as works councils. In smaller companies they may elect worker representatives who act as intermediaries in exercising the workers' rights of being informed or consulted on decisions concerning employee status and rights. They also elect or select worker representatives in managerial and supervisory organs of companies.

In codetermination systems the employees are given seats on a board of directors in one-tier management systems, or seats in a supervisory board and sometimes management board in two-tier management systems.

In one-tier systems with codetermination the employees usually have only one or two representatives on a board of directors. Sometimes they are also given seats in certain committees (e.g. the audit committee). They never have representatives among the executive directors.

The typical two-tier system with codetermination is the German system. The typical one-tier system with codetermination is the Swedish system.

There are three main views as to why codetermination exists: to reduce management-labour conflict by improving and systematizing communication channels; to increase bargaining power of workers at the expense of owners by means of legislation; and to correct market failures by means of public policy. The evidence on "efficiency" is mixed, with codetermination having either no effect or a positive but generally small effect on enterprise performance.

Impact 
A 2020 study in the Quarterly Journal of Economics found that co-determination in Germany had no impact on wages, the wage structure, the labor share, revenue, employment or profitability of the firm, but it increased capital investment.

A 2021 Study by the Bureau of Economic Research found that "the European model of codetermination is neither a panacea for all of the problems faced by 21st-century workers, nor a destructive institution that is dramatically inferior to shareholder primacy. Rather, as currently implemented, it is a moderate institution with, on net, nonexistent or small positive effects. Board-level and shop-floor worker representation cause at most small increases in wages, possibly lead to slight increases in job security and satisfaction, and have largely zero or small positive effects on firm performance."

Canada

Canada has no federal or provincial law mandating co-determination.

During the 2021 federal election, Conservative Party leader Erin O'Toole pledged to require that federally regulated employers with over 1,000 employees or $100 million in annual revenue include worker representation on their boards of directors should he be elected Prime Minister.

European Union

In the 1970s, the European Community (now the European Union) drafted the 5th Directive on company law, proposing a two-tier board and worker representation on supervisory boards. The law would have been similar to Germany's, but the proposal was not passed. The directive has not yet won widespread support to be brought into force.

Germany

The first codetermination plans began at companies and through collective agreements. At the end of World War I, the Stinnes-Legien Agreement between unions and business agreed that economic power would be shared throughout the economy. In 1920 a work council law was passed, and in 1922 a law to enable representation on company boards was passed. Hitler abolished codetermination, along with free trade unions, from 1933. After the military defeat of the fascist dictatorship in  World War II, codetermination was again restored from 1946 through collective agreements. In 1951, and 1952, the collective agreements were codified into new laws. This first affected the coal and steel industries of West Germany, with an equal number of worker and shareholder (or bank) representatives, and one-third representation on other large company boards.

The Codetermination Act 1976 (Mitbestimmungsgesetz 1976), and the Work Constitution Act 1972 (Betriebsverfassungsgesetz 1972) are the basis for the current law. The 1976 Act requires companies with over 2,000 workers to have just under one-half representation on the supervisory board, which in turn elects the management board. Shareholders (mostly banks) and workers (who can delegate their votes to trade unions) elect members of a supervisory board (Aufsichtsrat). The chairman of the supervisory board, with a casting vote, is always a shareholder representative under German law. The supervisory board is meant to set the company's general agenda. The supervisory board then elects a management board (Vorstand), which is actually charged with the day-to-day running of the company. The management board is required to have one worker representative (Arbeitsdirektor). In effect, shareholder voices still govern the company for a number of reasons, but not least because the supervisory board's vote for the management will always be a majority of shareholders.

Co-determination in Germany operates on three organisational levels:

1. Board of directors: Prior to 1976,  German coal and steel producers employing more than 1,000 workers already commonly maintained a board of directors composed of 11 members: five directors came from management, five were workers' representatives, with the eleventh member being neutral. (Note: Boards could be larger as long as the proportion of representation was maintained.) In 1976, the law's scope was expanded to cover all firms employing more than 2,000 workers; with some changes concerning to the board structure, which has an equal number of management and worker representatives, with no neutral members (except in the Mining-and-steel industries where the old law remained in force). The new board's head would represent the firm's owners and had the right to cast the deciding vote in instances of stalemate. (The original law comprising coal-and-steel industries thus remained unchanged in force)
2. Management: A worker representative sits with management in the capacity of Director for Human Resources. Elected by a majority of the Board of Directors, the workers' representative sits on the Board and enjoys the full rights accorded to that position.
3. Work councils: The workers committee has two main functions: it elects representatives to the board of directors and serves as an advisory body to the trade union regarding plant-level working conditions, insurance, economic assistance and related issues. The committee is elected by all the workers employed in a plant.

Thanks to the years during which a co-operative culture has been in place, management requests from workers for proposals to improve operations or increase productivity, for example, are no longer considered mere legal formalities; they represent recognition of the fact that workers play an important part in plant success. In tandem, a practical approach has evolved among both parties, with each aiming to reach decisions based on consensus. In addition, worker representatives no longer automatically reject every proposal for structural reform, increased efficiency or, even, layoffs; instead, they examine each suggestion from an inclusive, long-term perspective. At the core of this approach is transparency of information, such as economic data. Co-determination is thus practised at every level, from the local plant to firm headquarters.

Co-determination enjoys strong support among Germans in principle. In practice, there are many calls for amendments to the laws in various ways. One of the main achievements seems to be that workers are more involved and have more of a voice in their workplaces, which sees a return in high productivity. Furthermore, industrial relations are more harmonious with low levels of strike actions, while better pay and conditions are secured for employees.

New Zealand
The Companies Empowering Act 1924 allowed companies to issue shares for labour and have them represented by directors, but it was little used, even its chief promoter, Henry Valder, being unable to get his company board to agree to it. It was consolidated into the Companies Act in 1933. The Law Commission recommended its abolition in 1988 for lack of use. The Companies Act 1993 did not allow for labour shares.

United Kingdom

In the UK, the earliest examples of codetermination in management were codified into the Oxford University Act 1854 and the Cambridge University Act 1856. In private enterprise, the Port of London Act 1908 was introduced under Winston Churchill's Board of Trade.

Proposals for codetermination were drawn up, and a command paper produced named the Bullock Report. This was done in 1977 by Harold Wilson's Labour government. It involved a similar split on the board, but its effect would have been even more radical. Because UK company law requires no split in the boards of directors, unions would have directly elected the management of the company. Furthermore, rather than giving shareholders the slight upper hand as happened in Germany, a debated 'independent' element would be added to the board, reaching the formula 2x + y. However no action was ever taken as the UK slid into the winter of discontent and, as Labour lost the next election, two decades of Thatcherism. That tied into the European Commission's proposals for worker participation in the Fifth Company Law Directive, which was never implemented.

While most enterprises do not have worker representation, UK universities have done so since the 19th century. Generally the more successful the university, the more staff representation on governing bodies: Cambridge, Oxford, Edinburgh, Glasgow and other Scottish Universities, have rights for staff election of councils in statute, while other universities have a wide variety of different practices. Under the UK Corporate Governance Code 2020, listed companies must comply or explain with one of three worker involvement options including having a worker director on board. However, companies have not yet ensured workers have the right to vote for representatives on the board.

United States

A large number of universities also enable staff to vote in the governance structure. In the 1970s, a number of large corporations including Chrysler appointed workers to their board of directors pursuant to collective agreement with the labor union.

Massachusetts
Massachusetts has the world's oldest codetermination law that has been continually in force since 1919, although it is only voluntary and only for manufacturing companies.

See also
 Cooperative
 Worker cooperative
 Corporatism
 Employee stock ownership
 Labour law
 Labor union
 Market socialism
 Works council
 Workers' council
 Codetermination in Germany
 Polder model
 Paritarian Institutions
 Social Partnership
 Social ownership
 Worker representation on corporate boards of directors
 Workplace democracy

Notes

References
Articles
E Batstone, A Ferner and M Terry, Unions on the board: an experiment in industrial democracy (1983)
P Brannen, ‘Worker directors: an approach to analysis. The case of the British Steel Corporation’ in C Crouch and FA Heller, Organizational Democracy and Political Processes (Wiley 1983)
E Chell, ‘Worker Directors on the Board: Four Case Studies’ (1980) 2(6) Employee Relations 1
PL Davies and KW Wedderburn, ‘The Land of Industrial Democracy’ (1977) 6(1) ILJ 197
E McGaughey, 'The Codetermination Bargains: The History of German Corporate and Labour Law' (2016) 23(1) Columbia Journal of European Law 135 
E McGaughey, 'Votes at Work in Britain: Shareholder Monopolisation and the ‘Single Channel’' (2018) 47(1) Industrial Law Journal 76 
E McGaughey, 'Democracy in America at Work: The History of Labor's Vote in Corporate Governance' (2019) 42 Seattle University Law Review 697 
HJ Teuteberg, ‘Zur Entstehungsgeschichte der ersten betrieblichen Arbeitervertretungen in Deutschland’ (1960) 11 Soziale Welt 69
S Vitols, 'Prospects for trade unions in the evolving European system of corporate governance' (2005) ETUI, summarising different economic results of codetermination
Lord Wedderburn, ‘Companies and employees: common law or social dimension’ (1993) 109 Law Quarterly Review 261

Books
HJ Teuteberg, Geschichte der Industriellen Mitbestimmung in Deutschland (1961)
S Webb and B Webb, The History of Trade Unionism (1920) Appendix VIII

Reports
Lord Donovan, Royal Commission on Trade Unions and Employers’ Associations (1968) Cmnd 3623
Liberal Party, The Report of the Industrial Partnership Committee: Partners at Work (1968)
Uday Dokras, doctoral thesis, published as a book, The Act on Codetermination at Work- An Efficacy Study, Almqvist & Wiksell International, Stockholm Sweden, 1990

External links
 Emire: Germany - Co-Determination
 Emire: Austria - Co-Determination
 German Law in English - 40. Works council. Co-determination
 Co-Determination and Cooperative Culture in Israel

EU Draft Fifth Company Law Directive
 1983 Revision
 1991 Amendment

Human resource management
Labour law